Juan Carlos Calleja Hakker (born 11 February 1976) is a Salvadoran businessman and politician.  He is currently vice president of Grupo Calleja, owner of the largest supermarket chain (Super Selectos) in El Salvador—and former candidate for President of El Salvador for the Nationalist Republican Alliance (ARENA) for the presidential election of 2019.

Biography 

Calleja is the grandson of Daniel Calleja, a Spanish immigrant who entered the retail business in the 1950s and founder of the brand Super Selectos, and son of Francisco Calleja, also a Spaniard by birth and promoter of the expansion and consolidation at the end of the year. By the end of the 20th century, the brand was the main chain of supermarkets in El Salvador. In 2008, the Super Selectos chain led by the Callejas formed a strategic alliance with other Central American and Panamanian supermarket chains to develop a consolidated business strategy in view of the advance in the Walmart regional market. Calleja has been president of this alliance since 2010.

He has a degree in liberal arts from Middlebury College of Vermont (United States), where he graduated in 1999, and also holds a Masters in Business Administration from the Stern School of Business (New York University) obtained in 2005 During his stay in the United States he was vice president of FreshDirect, an online grocery store specializing in home delivery of their products.

He served between 2013 and 2017 as a member of the Board of Directors of the Salvadoran Foundation for Economic and Social Development (Fusades), as well as belonging to the Organization of Young Presidents (YPO in English), El Salvador chapter since the year 2002. He is president since 2014 of the Calleja Foundation, a non-profit organization dedicated to the construction of sustainable social development through investment in education, health and the environment.

He is married to Andrea Lima Guirola de Calleja.

Political career 

Calleja has been affiliated with the right-wing Nationalist Republican Alliance (ARENA) since 2013, at which time his name was mentioned as presidential in several affiliate circles for the 2014 elections; although, in the end the candidate for said elections would be the then-mayor of San Salvador, Norman Quijano, who was defeated by the candidate of the left-wing Farabundo Martí National Liberation Front (FMLN), Salvador Sánchez Cerén, in the disputed second round of elections.

He formalized his candidacy for the 2019 Salvadoran presidential election on 10 November 2017, when he registered with the National Electoral Commission of ARENA, and was elected on 22 April 2018 to represent the right-wing party after obtaining 60.8 percent of the votes cast for the 58,874 members who participated in the primary election, defeating the businessmen Javier Simán and Gustavo López Davidson. This candidacy was ratified on 23 June during the Extraordinary General Assembly of the political institute. His running mate was Carmen Aída Lazo from the National Coalition Party (PCN). In the election held on 3 February 2019, Calleja won 31.7 percent of the popular vote, losing to former San Salvador Mayor, Nayib Bukele of the Grand Alliance for National Unity (GANA).

References

Living people
1976 births
Nationalist Republican Alliance politicians
Salvadoran people of Spanish descent
Salvadoran businesspeople
People from San Salvador
Middlebury College alumni